Genese is both a surname and a given name. Notable people with the name include:

Frank Genese, American architect
Robert William Genese (1848–1928), Irish mathematician
Genese Davis (born 1984), American writer